Sons and Daughters were a Scottish rock band from Glasgow, Scotland, in existence from 2001 to 2012.

Biography
Conceived while on tour with Arab Strap in 2001, Sons and Daughters was initially Adele Bethel's creation. The band's line-up at first comprised Bethel, David Gow and Ailidh Lennon, and the band began recording.

After the later addition of Scott Paterson as a second vocalist, the band played a number of successful concerts. Their debut release, the twenty five minutes-long Love the Cup was financed by the band and initially released on Ba Da Bing Records label in 2003, and later re-released when Sons and Daughters signed to Domino Records in 2004.

Their second album, The Repulsion Box was released in June 2005. In February 2006 the band were invited to tour with Morrissey on the first leg of his UK tour. Their third album, This Gift, produced by Bernard Butler, was released on 28 January 2008.

After a few years of relative inactivity the band released a free download, "Silver Spell", accompanied by a trailer for their new album, Mirror Mirror, which was released on 13 June 2011.

On 2 November 2012, the band announced that they would no longer continue as a band bringing an end to 11 years of their career.

Band members
Adele Bethel - Vocals, guitar, piano
David Gow - Drums, percussion
Ailidh Lennon - Bass, mandolin, piano
Scott Paterson - Vocals, guitar

Touring
Graeme Smilie - Bass (touring bassist while Lennon was on maternity leave, 2008)

Discography

Albums
 2003: Love the Cup (re-issued in 2004)
 2005: The Repulsion Box – UK: No. 70
 2008: This Gift – UK: No. 66
 2011: Mirror Mirror – UK: No. 200

Singles

References

External links

 Archive of official website from 2014

Musical groups from Glasgow
Musical groups established in 2001
Musical groups disestablished in 2012
Scottish indie rock groups